Püttlingen is a town in Saarland, Germany, 10 km northwest of Saarbrücken.

Geography
The town lies in the Köller Valley, approximately 20 km to the northwest of Saarbrücken and 5 km north of Völklingen. Going in a clockwise direction from the north, the neighbouring communities are Heusweiler, Riegelsberg, Saarbrücken and Völklingen in the Regionalverband Saarbrücken and the communities of Bous and Schwalbach in the Landkreis Saarlouis.

Climate
The annual precipitation amounts to 834 mm which places it in the top third of German locales according to the German Weather Service. The driest month is April, while November, the wettest month, sees 1.4 times as much rain.

Subdivision
The town is composed of the subdivisions of Püttlingen (made up of the Berg, Bengesen and Ritterstraße areas) and Köllerbach (made up of the Engelfangen, Etzenhofen, Herchenbach, Kölln, Rittenhofen, and Sellerbach areas).

Mayors
 1946–1949: Peter Zimmer
 1949–1956: Peter Müller
 1956–1966: Nikolaus Boßmann, CDU
 1966–1974: Hans Koch, independent 
 1974–2001: Rudolf Müller, CDU
 2002–2019: Martin Speiche, CDU
 2019–incumbent : Denise Klein, SPD

Twin towns – sister cities

Püttlingen is twinned with:

 Ber, Mali
 Créhange, France
 Fresagrandinaria, Italy
 Nowa Sól, Poland
 Saint-Michel-sur-Orge, France
 Senftenberg, Germany
 Veszprém, Hungary
 Žamberk, Czech Republic

Notable people
Annegret Kramp-Karrenbauer (born 1962), politician (CDU)
Patrik Kühnen (born 1966), tennis player and Davis Cup team captain
Johann Nikolaus Weislinger (1691–1755), Jesuit polemicist
Hendrick Zuck (born 1990), footballer

References

Towns in Saarland
Saarbrücken (district)